The Hualapai are a tribe of Native Americans that live in Arizona. Hualapai may also refer to:

Havasupai–Hualapai language, the language of the Hualapai
Hualapai Airport, an airport owned by the Hualapai in Coconino County, Arizona
Hualapai Mountains, a mountain range in Mohave County, Arizona
Hualapai Flat, a valley in Nevada
Walapai, Arizona, an unincorporated community in Mohave County, also known as Hualapai